Acrokeratoelastoidosis may refer to:
 Acrokeratoelastoidosis of Costa
 Acrokeratoelastoidosis lichenoides

Papulosquamous hyperkeratotic cutaneous conditions